Non-monogamy (or nonmonogamy) is an umbrella term for every practice or philosophy of non-dyadic intimate relationship that does not strictly hew to the standards of monogamy, particularly that of having only one person with whom to exchange sex, love, and/or affection. In that sense, "nonmonogamy" may be accurately applied to extramarital sex, group marriage, or polyamory. It is not synonymous with infidelity, since all parties are consenting to the relationship structure, partners are often committed to each other as well as to their other partners and cheating is still considered problematic behavior with many non-monogamous relationships.

More specifically, "nonmonogamy" indicates forms of interpersonal relationship, intentionally undertaken, in which demands for exclusivity (of sexual interaction or emotional connection, for example) are attenuated or eliminated, and individuals may form multiple and simultaneous sexual and/or romantic bonds. This stands in contrast to monogamy, yet may arise from the same psychology. According to Jessica Fern, a psychologist and the author of Polysecure: Attachment, Trauma and Consensual Nonmonogamy, as of September 2020, about 4% of Americans, nearly 16 million people, are "practising a non-monogamous style of relationship" while the a 2016 study said that over 21% of Americans engaged in consensual non-monogamy at "some point in their lifetime." In January 2020, a YouGov poll found that about one-third of US adults believe that "their ideal relationship is non-monogamous to some degree."

Terminology 
Many terms for non-monogamous practices are vague, being based on criteria such as "relationship" or "love" that are themselves subjectively defined. There are forms of non-monogamy whose practitioners set themselves apart by qualifiers, such as "ethically non-monogamous" which intends a distancing from the deceit or subterfuge they perceive in common cheating and adultery. This usage creates distinctions beyond the definitions of the words. For example, though some relations might literally be both polygamous and polyamorous, polygamy usually signifies a codified form of multiple marriage, based on established religious teachings such as Plural marriage, a form of polygyny associated with the Latter Day Saint movement in the 19th-century and with present-day splinter groups from that faith, as well as evangelical sects that advocate Christian Plural Marriage.

Polyamory is based on the preferences of the participants rather than social custom or established precedent. There is no one 'right' way to engage in non-monogamy (although there are widely agreed on 'wrong' ways). Because of this, the terms for the various kinds of relationships can be vague and sometimes interchangeable. but there are some distinctions that are worth defining. For example, swingers may intentionally avoid emotional and social connection to those—other than their primary partner—with whom they have sex, so may or may not be polyamorous but are non-monogamous.

Some useful terms are Metamour or Meta, the common term for a person with whom a partner is shared, V-Structure, one person is equally involved with two partners, and Triads / Quads. The latter is when three or four participants make up the primary partnership.

Forms of non-monogamy are varied. They include a casual relationship, sometimes called friends with benefits, which is a primarily physical relationship between two people with low expectations of commitment or emotional labor, and an open relationship (incl. open marriage), referring to one or both members of a committed (or married) couple have the express freedom to become sexually active with others, Other forms include sexual activities involving more than two participants at the same time, referring to group sex orgies, and threesomes, a primarily sexual arrangement involving three people. There's also relationship anarchy where participants are not bound by set rules in relationships other than whatever is explicitly agreed upon by the people involved, and swinging, which refers to similar to an organized social activity, often involving some form of group sex and sometimes simply trading partners with other swingers. There's also concepts such as Polyfidelity, where participants have multiple partners but restrict sexual activity to within a certain group, and a situation where there is a main romantic relationship with all other relationships being second to it, known as primary/secondary. One of the most well-known forms is polygamy, where one person is married to multiple partners. This has two primary sub-forms: polyandry where a woman has multiple husbands, group or conjoint marriage, and polygyny, referring to a man has multiple wives. The latter is more widespread in Africa than in any other continent, especially in West Africa and in North America, it is practiced by some Mormon sects, such as the Fundamentalist Church of Jesus Christ of Latter-Day Saints (FLDS Church).

Although its sometimes confused with it, there is polyamory, referring to when participants have multiple romantic partners It comes in various forms, such as hierarchical polyamory, where there is a primary romantic relationship with all other relationships being secondary to it, kitchen table polyamory which refers to people are expected to know one another and be comfortable in each others' company, and parallel polyamory, with relationships between people who are kept separately, all may be aware of each other, but are not expected to be friends. There is also group marriage, where several people form a single familial unit and each person considered to be married to all other members. Line families are a form of group marriage intended to outlive its original members by ongoing addition of new spouses and poly families, which is similar to group marriage, but some members may not consider themselves married to all other members.

Favorable preexisting conditions before non-monogamy

Michael Shernoff cites two studies in his report on same-sex couples considering non-monogamy. Morin (1999) stated that a couple has a very good chance of adjusting to non-exclusivity if at least some of the following conditions exist. This includes both partners wanting their relationship to remain primary, the couple having an established reservoir of good will, and a minimum of lingering resentments from past hurts and betrayals. Other conditions
include the partners in agreement on the question of monogamy/non-monogamy and the partners feeling similarly powerful and autonomous. Additionally, Green and Mitchell (2002) stated that direct discussion of the following issues can provide the basis for honest and important conversations, including openness versus secrecy, volition and equality versus coercion and inequality. Other issues include clarity and specificity of agreements versus confusion/vagueness, honoring keeping agreements versus violating them, and how each partner views non-monogamy. According to Shernoff, if the matter is discussed with a third party, such as a therapist, the task of the therapist is to "engage couples in conversations that let them decide for themselves whether sexual exclusivity or non-exclusivity is functional or dysfunctional for the relationship."

Public health and morality 

The concepts of monogamy and marriage have been strongly intertwined for centuries, and in English-language dictionaries one is often used to define the other, as when "monogamy" is "being married to one person at a time." A common antonym is polygamy, meaning to have more than one spouse at one time. As a result, monogamy is deeply entrenched within many religions, and in social regulations and law, and exceptions are condemned as incursions on both morality and public health.

To some, the term non-monogamy semantically implies that monogamy is the norm, with other forms of relational intimacy being deviant and therefore somehow unhealthy or immoral. This concern over sexually transmitted diseases is despite the common practice of regular testing and sharing of recent test results prior to engaging in sexual activity.

It is often assumed that people who participate in non-monogamous sexual relationships have a higher rate of STIs. Despite reporting a higher number of sexual partners, research suggests that the risk of transmitting STIs is no higher than they are among the monogamous population. This is because the non-monogamous community is more likely to be regularly tested and more open about their results. The stigma of receiving a positive result is diminished, resulting in better treatment options and fewer people who are unwittingly transmitting the disease because they were not told by the person who gave it to them.

See also

Plaçage
Sexual revolution
 Adultery
 Family: the web series
 Consensual non-monogamy
 Group sex
 List of polyamorists
 List of polyamorous characters in fiction
 Polyday
 Romantic orientation
 Sociosexual orientation
 The Four Loves (Book)

References

Sexual fidelity
Intimate relationships